"Stay Down Here Where You Belong" was a pacifist song written by Irving Berlin in 1914. The lyrics depict a conversation between the devil and his son, the devil exhorting him to "stay down here where you belong" because people on Earth do not know right from wrong.

While Henry Burr's recording of the song may have mirrored a large portion of American sentiment during the early days of World War I, the eventual entry of the United States into the conflict and the consequent reversal of the national mood turned the song into a major source of embarrassment for Berlin, who is better known for his subsequent patriotic songs. One of Berlin's peeves was the penchant of Groucho Marx to sing the song; Berlin offered Marx $100 not to do it again. A rendition by Marx appears on his concert album, An Evening with Groucho.

A rendition of "Stay Down Here Where You Belong" was also recorded by Tiny Tim. In the late 20th and early 21st century it has also been performed by the New Leviathan Oriental Foxtrot Orchestra.

See also
 List of anti-war songs

References

1914 songs
Songs written by Irving Berlin
Anti-war songs
Songs of World War I